Formosa Betrayed is a 1965 book written by George H. Kerr, a US diplomatic officer in Taiwan, who witnessed the February 28 Incident, and the corruption and killings committed by the Kuomintang (KMT, Chinese Nationalist Party) in Taiwan after World War II.

Formosa Betrayed is one of the most influential books about Taiwan's transition from Japanese colonial rule. Kerr was working for the American Foreign Service at the time of the transition, and was present in Taiwan during the KMT occupation and resulting aftermath. Formosa Betrayed sharply rebuked the Nationalist administration and made arguments in favor of Taiwanese independence.

The book was originally published in 1965 by Houghton Mifflin. A Chinese-language translation was made in 1974, the English-language version was republished in 1976 by Da Capo Press, a second English-language edition was published by Taiwan Publishing Co. in 1992, and a new Chinese-language translation was released in 2014.

References

Editions
 

Da Capo Press books
History books about Taiwan